Espinaredo is one of 24 parishes (administrative divisions) in Piloña, a municipality within the province and autonomous community of Asturias, in northern Spain.

The population is 164 (INE 2011).

Villages and hamlets
 Cuerrias 
 Porciles 
 Riofabar 
 Sierra 
 Soto de Espinaredo 
 La Villa 
 El Campon 
 Ferran 
 Pandelamazca
 Pedroso 
 Raicedo (Raicéu) 
 Rioquemado (Riquimáu) 
 Tabayon (El Tabayón)

References

Parishes in Piloña